Hopland may refer to:

 Hopland, California, United States
 Hopland, Hordaland in Austrheim municipality, Hordaland, Norway
 Hopland, Sogn og Fjordane in Stryn municipality, Sogn og Fjordane, Norway
 Old Hopland, California